Maryse Liburdi (formerly Maryse Thomas) is the former chairman and CEO of Pokeware, a technology company and ad exchange she founded in 1997. In September 2017, she was convicted of fraud for having deceived investors about the financial state of the company.

Other work

Liburdi has been an active member of the lobbying organization Technet and has participated in regional events advocating innovation economics. In 2017 it was announced that she was one of the managers of a venture capital fund investing in sub-Saharan Africa tech startups.

Fraud conviction
Liburdi was arrested in April 2016 in Rome, stemming from US charges accused of investor fraud in the range of $25–30 million. In June, 2017, she pled guilty of having defrauded investors by falsifying the company's bank accounts, making Pokeware appear to be in better financial condition than it was. Over a million dollars in investor money was spent on Liburdi's personal life. On September 29, 2017, Liburdi was sentenced to 49 months in prison followed three years of supervised release, and ordered to repay the $7 million and to forfeit another $7 million.

References

External links 
Arab Net
Endeavour Magazine
Yahoo! Finance
London Loves Business

American businesspeople convicted of crimes
American female criminals
American people convicted of fraud
American prisoners and detainees
American technology chief executives
American women chief executives
Living people
MacOS software
Year of birth missing (living people)